Durga Prasad Sharma, better known as D. P. Sharma (born 1 May 1969), is an Indian computer scientist and disability rights activist.

Early life and career
Son of a small farmer Ninua Ram Sharma, Durga Prasad Sharma was born in Samona village of Rajakhera Tehsil in Rajasthan, India. He was the youngest brother of the second number among 5 brothers and 3 sisters. His left arm and right leg are affected by post-polio syndrome. After completing his primary level education, he had to walk 18 kilometers daily from his village Samona to attend the school in Rajakhera. Later he completed his degree-level education (BSc) from Government College Dholpur, Master of Computer Application (MCA), Master of Technology (M.Tech.) in Information Technology, as well as Ph.D. (Intranetwares) from University of Rajasthan, India.

In 1994, Sharma joined a national advocacy campaign for the new disabled welfare and rehabilitation legislation in India which resulted in a new law passed by the Indian Parliament, "Equal Opportunity, Protection of Rights and Full Participation Act 1995".

In 2000, Sharma became Assistant Professor of Computer Science & Informatics and later promoted to Associate Professor and a Full Professor.

He is an expatriate research adviser at the Rajasthan Technical University, Kota (India). He has been serving as an honorary adviser to an international educational program run by Vrije Universiteit Brussel (Belgium).

Achievements 
In 2005, he developed a job search engine for people with disabilities which was later adopted by the Ministry of Social Justice and Empowerment, Government of India. It was designed to help disabled people in search of jobs based on their suitability of working environment and physical limitations. The search engine was featured as a cover story in the SMB edition of PCQuest in March 2008.

In 2017, Sharma was nominated as National Brand Ambassador (Academicians and Youth) by the Prime Minister of India, Narendra Modi, to the nation-wide campaign Swachh Bharat Mission (Clean India Drive) .

In 2019, on the basis of Sharma's recommendation, the Government of Rajasthan started a process of establishing a Technical University in Jaipur, Rajasthan to provide technology-enabled training, education, and rehabilitation to people with disabilities.

Sharma authored or co-authored 22 books, edited/reviewed several academic articles and contributed editorials on labour and disability issues for Rajasthan Patrika. He is also a member of editorial boards of two academic journals – the Maxwell Science Journal and the International Journal of Future Computer and Communication – both of which, however, have been included on Beall's List as predatory or questionable journals.

Sharma advocates for end-to-end transformations in the Indian education system. He is involved in designing policies for inclusive internet access.

Selected awards and honours 
Civil Services Chronicle Award (1997) by Chronicle India Publications

Selected publications
Foundation of Operating Systems(Print), Publisher: Excel Books
Information Technology(Print), Vol-2, August 2009, p. 282
Theory of Computation(Print), Vol-3, August 2012, p. 250

Distributed and Prioritised Scheduling to Implement Carrier Aggregation in LTE Advanced Systems, IEEE Computer Society Digital Library, ACCT'14', February 2014 p;390–393

Autonomic Resource Management in a Cloud-Based Infrastructure Environment, Springer, Vol-1, 2021, p. 325-345,
Autonomic Computing: Models, Applications, and Brokerage, Springer, Vol-1, 2021, p.  59-90,
Emerging Paradigms and Practices in Cloud Resource Management, Springer, Vol-1, 2021, p.  0-17,

References

External links
 United College of Engineering & Research, Greater Noida

Living people
Writers from Rajasthan
1969 births
People from Rajasthan
Disability rights activists